Hogtan Run is a  long 1st order tributary to Buffalo Creek in Brooke County, West Virginia.  This is the only stream of this name in the United States.

Variant names
According to the Palmer's Farmer Map of Brooke County, West Virginia, this stream is also known as
Hogelands Run

Course
Hogtan Run rises about 3 miles east of Windsor Heights, West Virginia, and then flows east and northeast to join Buffalo Creek about 2 miles west of Bethany.

Watershed
Hogtan Run drains  of area, receives about 40.2 in/year of precipitation, has a wetness index of 295.41, and is about 66% forested.

See also
List of rivers of West Virginia

References

Rivers of West Virginia
Rivers of Brooke County, West Virginia